Zabelia tyaihyoni, synonym Abelia mosanensis, the fragrant abelia, is a species of deciduous shrub in the honeysuckle family Caprifoliaceae. The tubular blooms are pinkish-white and highly scented, appearing in late Spring. The glossy green leaves turn red in autumn before falling.

Zabelia tyaihyoni is a popular garden shrub. The cultivar 'Korean Spring' (under the name Abelia mosanensis) has gained the Royal Horticultural Society's Award of Garden Merit.

References

Caprifoliaceae
Taxa named by Takenoshin Nakai
Trees of Korea